This page describes the qualification procedure for EuroBasket Women 2011.

Qualification format
The Qualifying Round was held from August 2 to August 29, 2010.

The top 2 teams in each group qualified to the EuroBasket Women 2011.

The best 6 of the remaining teams went to the Additional Qualifying Round, from which one additional team qualified to EuroBasket Women 2011.

The last 4 teams played in the Relegation Round, from which 2 teams were relegated to Division B in 2012–2013.

The Additional Qualifying Round and the Relegation Round were held from May 16 to June 11, 2011.

Qualifying round
The draw for the Qualifying Round was held on January 16, 2010. The remaining 18 teams in Division A were divided into two groups of 5 teams and two groups of 4 teams.

Group A

Note: All times are local

Group B

Note: All times are local

Group C

Note: All times are local

Group D

Note: All times are local

Additional Qualifying Round
The winner of each group will advance to a playoff for one spot at the EuroBasket Women 2011.

Group A

Group B

Playoff

Germany qualified for the Eurobasket Women 2011 after winning against Hungary 126–109 on aggregate.

External links
  Eurobasket Women qualification at FIBA-Europe.com 

EuroBasket Women qualification
EuroBasket Women 2011
2010–11 in European women's basketball